The Tour de Savoie Mont-Blanc was a multi-day cycling race held annually in the departments of Savoie and Haute-Savoie in France between 1999 and 2021. It was held as part of the UCI Europe Tour, as a category 2.2 race.

After its 2021 edition, the Tour de Savoie Mont-Blanc was superseded by the Maurienne Classic one-day race, to be held for the first time in August 2022.

Winners

References

External links
 

Cycle races in France
Recurring sporting events established in 1999
1999 establishments in France
Recurring sporting events disestablished in 2021
2021 disestablishments in France
UCI Europe Tour races